Kangwon National University School of Law (Korean:강원대학교 법학전문대학원, also known as KNU Law School 강원법대 로스쿨 or KangLaw 강로) is one of the professional graduate schools of Kangwon National University (KNU). Located in Chuncheon, Republic of Korea, it is one of the 25 government approved law schools. It specializes in environmental law and offers scholarship to all eligible students.

History

Chronology
 June 1946 - KNU established.
 January 1970 - Law Department(as 'The College of Law and Management') established.
 March 1970 - First Bachelor of Laws (LL.B) course to be operated.
 December 1979 - First Master of Law (LL.M) course to be operated.
 March 1980 - 'The College of Law' become independent.
 October 1981 - First Juris Doctor (JD) course to be operated.
 March 1982 - Bakrimheun(백림헌), student study group for Korean Bar-exam, has been formed. 'Legal Resources Centre' opened.
 March 1983 - The Institute of Comparative Legal Studies(비교법학연구소) has been established.
 March 1989 - The College of Law was separated from (the Department of) Public Law and Civil Law
 March 1996 - Two departments forced to unify and create 'the (universal) Division of Law'
 March 2000 - KNU Law Library, as a transformation of LRC from its previous year, elevated as an annex of KNU Central Library.
 March 2002 - The one-and-only (in South Korea), 'Graduate School of Judicial Affairs'(법무전문대학원) has been operated, as a model for the very-early stage of 'reform on Korean legal system' during Kim Dae-jung Administration
 March 2005 - Completion of the KNU Law main building which it stands today
 March 2008 - The last group of students for the college of law entered
 March 2009 - First class for KNU Law School (College of Law has been officially abolished, due to this improvement). GLSF formed.
 September 2009 - The state-of-the-art KNU Law Library, linked just next to the KNU Law building, completed.

Degree programs
Juris Doctor (J.D.) Program 40 students in each 1st, 2nd and 3rd grades.
Other courses will be introduced.

Organizations and forums
 The Institute of Comparative Legal Studies - Founded in 1985, this organization (Korean:비교법학연구소) is to aim of contributing its school and Korean society, with developing its own legal contents, cases, professional studies, materials, and 'legal clinic'(consulting legal matters for the local people of Gangwon, introduced in 2009). On every twice a year, they published its 'review'(Kangwon Law Review, 강원법학) in Korean, and held its professional scholarly symposium frequently on both domestically and internationally. Once KNU Law decided specifically focusing on the 'environment', this organization, naturally, also have a direct division of Environmental Law to prospect what it needs.
 Global Law & Society Forum - Founded on March 6, 2009, this forum is to improve its global perspective on both controversial legal and social matters, with learning Foreign (mainly English) language skills significantly while participating. The 'forum' is being held on every Wednesday afternoon, in English, with a few exception of Korean-moderated 'seminar', which held occasionally.

Advantages
KNU Law is recently increasing its global sight with having an exchange agreement with University of Kiel college of law in Germany, Kyushu Lawschool and Hokkaido Lawschool in Japan, Slippery Rock University of Pennsylvania in the United States, and CUHK Faculty of Law in Hong Kong(China). Furthermore, this school has been joined a number of MOU agreements including Lewis & Clark Law School (in July 2011) and other major universities around the globe. All qualified students of the JD programme with having more than overall average of B degree, receives scholarship that cover the full of its tuition in each semesters.

See also
 Law school in South Korea
 Legal Education Eligibility Test

References

External links 
 Official Homepage
 Comparative Legal Studies Institute, Official Webpage

Law schools in South Korea
Educational institutions established in 2009
2009 establishments in South Korea